Oh Say Can You Scream is a VHS video of live performances by Skid Row featuring songs from the band's self-titled debut album. It was released on December 4, 1990. Running time is 100 minutes. The video includes 12 live performances from all over the world plus behind the scenes footage and uncensored video clips of "18 and Life", "Youth Gone Wild", "I Remember You", and "Piece of Me".

Track listing
"Big Guns" (Rob Affuso, Rachel Bolan, Scotti Hill, Dave "The Snake" Sabo)
"Makin' a Mess" (Sebastian Bach, Bolan, Sabo)
"Rattlesnake Shake" (Bolan, Sabo)
"Piece of Me" (Bolan)
"Sweet Little Sister" (Bolan, Sabo)
"I Remember You" (Bolan, Sabo)
"Cold Gin" (Ace Frehley)
"Here I Am" (Bolan, Sabo)
"Holidays in the Sun" (Paul Cook, Steve Jones, Glen Matlock, Johnny Rotten)
"Train Kept A-Rollin'" (Tiny Bradshaw, Howard Kay, Lois Mann)
"Blitzkrieg Bop" (Dee Dee Ramone, Tommy Ramone)
"Youth Gone Wild" (Bolan, Sabo)
Uncensored clips
"Piece of Me [Uncut Version]"
"18 and Life [Uncut Version]"
"I Remember You"

Certifications

References

Skid Row (American band) video albums
1990 video albums